BBDD may refer to:

Battle Born Derby Demons, roller derby league based in Reno, Nevada
Birmingham Blitz Derby Dames, roller derby league based in Birmingham in England